Loumia Hiridjee (1 March 1962 – 26 November 2008) was a French businesswoman and co-founder of international lingerie brand Princesse Tam Tam. Hiridjee was born in Antananarivo, Madagascar, where she grew up in a family of wealthy Indian traders. In 1972 she joined her sister Sharma at a boarding school in France. In 1985 together they founded the Princesse Tam Tam brand (named after a 1935 film starring Josephine Baker). Hiridjee and her husband Mourad Amarsy were dining at the Oberoi Trident hotel in Mumbai, when they were shot and killed by armed attackers during the November 2008 Mumbai terrorist attacks.

References

External links

1962 births
2008 deaths
People from Antananarivo
20th-century French businesspeople
Victims of the 2008 Mumbai attacks
Malagasy emigrants to France